John Ballard (died 20 September 1586) was an English priest executed for being involved in an attempt to assassinate Queen Elizabeth I of England in the Babington Plot.

Biography 
John Ballard was the son of William Ballard of Wratting, Suffolk. Ballard matriculated at St Catharine's College, Cambridge in 1569, but subsequently migrated to Caius College, Cambridge, and on the 29 November 1579 went on to study at the English College at Rheims. He was ordained as a secular priest at Châlons on 4 March 1581, and was sent back to England on 29 March as a Catholic missionary and, as such, had a price on his head. To conceal his true identity, he played the part of a swashbuckling, courtly soldier called Captain Fortescue and was once described as wearing 'a fine cape laced with gold, a cut satin doublet and silver buttons on his hat'. Being a tall, dark-complexioned man, he was referred to by those who were unaware of his true identity as 'Black Foskew'.

The Babington Plot 

In the Babington Plot, Ballard instigated Anthony Babington, Chidiock Tichborne and others to assassinate the Queen as a prelude to a full-blown invasion of England by Spanish-led Catholic forces. However, the plot had been discovered and nurtured by Queen Elizabeth's spymaster Francis Walsingham from the start. Indeed, Ballard's inseparable companion and fixer, Barnard Maude, who travelled everywhere with him, was a government spy.

The plot was manipulated by Walsingham in order to bring about his primary objective: the downfall of Mary, Queen of Scots. When Mary gave her consent to the plot by replying to a letter sent to her by Babington, her days were numbered.

With this vital piece of evidence in his possession, Walsingham had Ballard and the other conspirators arrested. Ballard was tortured. The conspirators were tried at Westminster Hall on 13 and 14 September 1586 and found guilty of treason and conspiracy against the Crown. They were executed by hanging, drawing and quartering in two batches on the 20 and 21 September. Ballard was executed on the first day along with the other main conspirators. The manner of their deaths was so bloody and horrific that it deeply shocked those who were present at the spectacle. When Elizabeth was told of the suffering the men had endured on the scaffold, and its effect on the many witnesses, she is said to have ordered that the remaining seven conspirators be left hanging until they were 'quite dead' before being cut down and butchered.

In popular culture

 Ballard was played by Tom Fleming in the film Mary, Queen of Scots (1971).
 In the 1972 BBC TV-miniseries Elizabeth R episode "Horrible Conspiracies," Ballard was portrayed by David Garfield.
 In the 1998 film Elizabeth he is portrayed by Daniel Craig.

References

Year of birth missing
1586 deaths
Alumni of Gonville and Caius College, Cambridge
People executed under Elizabeth I by hanging, drawing and quartering
People executed under the Tudors for treason against England
Executed people from Suffolk
People from the Borough of St Edmundsbury